William Rayson (18 December 1889 – 8 September 1957) was an Australian cricketer. He played six first-class cricket matches for Victoria between 1925 and 1929.

References

External links
 

1889 births
1957 deaths
Australian cricketers
Victoria cricketers
Cricketers from Melbourne